Bernard (Barney) Kilgore was a managing editor of The Wall Street Journal from 1941 to 1965 and head of the Dow Jones company.

In 1961 Kilgore received the Elijah Parish Lovejoy Award as well as an honorary Doctor of Laws degree from Colby College. He was a graduate of DePauw University in Greencastle, Indiana.

In 1966, Kilgore received the Golden Plate Award of the American Academy of Achievement.

Kilgore is the subject of the book "Restless Genius" by Richard J. Tofel.

See also
Princeton Packet

References

External links 
The Journal's Genius: Barney Kilgore Built His Vision, June 23, 1989

1908 births
1967 deaths
Elijah Parish Lovejoy Award recipients
The Wall Street Journal people
Editors of New York City newspapers
DePauw University alumni